Adminer (formerly known as phpMinAdmin) is a tool for managing content in databases. It natively supports MySQL, MariaDB, PostgreSQL, SQLite, MS SQL, Oracle, Elasticsearch and MongoDB. Adminer is distributed under Apache license (or GPL v2) in a form of a single PHP file (around 470 KiB in size). Its author is Jakub Vrána who started to develop this tool as a light-weight alternative to phpMyAdmin, in July 2007. Adminer got some attention in 2008 when it made it to the CCA finals at SourceForge. Also, first webhosting providers  started to include Adminer as MySQL managing tool into their portfolio of services. In 2012 Adminer got coverage on Linux.com for the second time. The project's priorities, according to its author, are (in this order): safety, user-friendliness, performance, functionality, and size.

Features
 Users log in specifying the destination server and providing the user name and password (which is stored during whole session)
 Basic functions: select database, select/edit tables, browse/insert/edit table rows
 Searching or sorting via multiple columns
 Editing of other database objects: views, triggers, events, stored procedures, processes, mysql variables, user permissions
 Text area for arbitrary SQL commands and storing these commands in command history
 Export of databases and tables (its structures and/or data) as a dump to output or a downloadable attachment
 User-friendly interface (extensive employment of JavaScript)
 Multiple language support (Arabic, Bengali, Catalan, Chinese, Czech, Dutch, English, Estonian, French, German, Greek, Hungarian, Italian, Indonesian, Japanese, Korean, Lithuanian, Persian, Polish, Portuguese, Romanian, Russian, Serbian, Slovak, Slovenian, Spanish, Tamil, Thai, Turkish, Ukrainian, Vietnamese)
 SQL syntax highlighting
 Visual database/E-R schema editing
 Countermeasures against XSS, CSRF, SQL injection, session-stealing, ...
 "Light-weight" – released in a form of a single file
 Support of CSS "skins", as well as many extensions

The small single file is a result of compilation and minification of source codes.

See also
 Comparison of database tools
 phpMyAdmin
 MySQL
 PHP

References

External links
Project homepage
Review at Linux.com

Database administration tools
Free software programmed in PHP
Cross-platform software
Software using the Apache license
MySQL
MariaDB
PostgreSQL
SQLite
Oracle database tools
Microsoft database software